Operation Chopper was a British Commando raid by No. 1 Commando during the Second World War.

The raid, over the night of 27/28 September 1941, targeted Saint-Aubin-d'Arquenay in France; a troop of No. 1 Commando spent a day ashore.

References

Conflicts in 1941
World War II British Commando raids
1941 in France
Military history of Normandy
C
Amphibious operations involving the United Kingdom